"I Know What I'm Here For" is a song by British rock band James. It was the first single released from their eighth studio album, Millionaires, and reached number 22 on the UK Singles Chart.

Background, release and reception

The single was released on CD and cassette and reached number 22 in the UK Top 40 chart, spending five weeks on the chart.

A live version and a video appeared on the limited edition two-disc edition of Millionaires.

The backing to the song was used by Ford in adverts shown during broadcasts of the UEFA Champions League in the 2007/2008 football season.

Peter Buckley, in The Rough Guide to Rock, described it as an "effortless soaring track". In contrast, Victoria Segal, reviewing the track for the NME, described it as "not interesting ... just silly".

Track listings

UK CD1 (Mercury JIMCD 22)
"I Know What I'm Here For"
"All Good Boys"
"Imagine Ourselves"

UK CD2 (Mercury JIMDD 22)
"I Know What I'm Here For"
"Downstairs"
"Stolen Horse"

UK cassette single (Mercury JIMMC22)
"I Know What I'm Here For"
"All Good Boys"

European maxi-CD single (Mercury 562 261-2)
"I Know What I'm Here For"
"All Good Boys"
"Imagine Ourselves"
"Downstairs"

Charts

References

James (band) songs
1999 singles
1999 songs
Mercury Records singles
Song recordings produced by Brian Eno